The Northern Great Lakes Visitor Center  is a visitor center and natural history museum located west of Ashland, Wisconsin, near the corner of Highway G and U.S. Highway 2. The facility is open seven days per week and offers free admission.

Facility 
The facility opened in 1998, and is operated through a partnership that includes the US Forest Service, National Park Service, United States Fish and Wildlife Service, Wisconsin Historical Society, University of Wisconsin–Extension, and the Friends of the Center Alliance, Limited.

The center has three floors of exhibits, with the first floor housing the natural history exhibits, information center, conference room, gift shop, and the Martin Hansen Theatre. A large variety of historical and science-related documentaries can be viewed in the Theatre, at the request of visitors.

The second floor is the home of a regional archive office, of the Wisconsin Historical Society.

Behind the building is a ¾-mile interpretive boardwalk trail that winds along a black ash swamp, sedge meadow, and mature cedar and tamarack swamp.

Exhibits 
The main permanent exhibit on the first floor offers an extensive display of the natural history of the region, particularly as it relates to Lake Superior. A smaller exhibit space on the second floor is home to a periodically changing exhibit, which usually relates more to regional human history, rather than natural history.

References

External links 
Official Website

Visitor centers in the United States
Natural history museums in Wisconsin
History museums in Wisconsin
Museums established in 1998
Museums in Ashland County, Wisconsin
1998 establishments in Wisconsin
Ashland, Wisconsin